Senator Platt may refer to:

Members of the United States Senate
Orville H. Platt (1827–1905), U.S. Senator from Connecticut from 1879 to 1905
Thomas C. Platt (1833–1910), U.S. Senator from New York in 1881 and from 1897 to 1909

United States state senate members
Frank C. Platt (1866–1952), New York State Senate
Jonas Platt (1769–1834), New York State Senate
Moss K. Platt (1809–1876), New York State Senate
Nehemiah Platt (1797–1851), New York State Senate
Zephaniah Platt (1735–1807), New York State Senate